"Strike Up the Band" is a 1927 song composed by George Gershwin, with lyrics by Ira Gershwin with the collaboration of Millie Raush. It was written for the 1927 musical Strike Up the Band, where it formed part of a satire on war and militaristic music. Although the musical was not successful, the instrumental version of the song, titled the "March from Strike Up the Band", has become quite well known. The song was also used in the Judy Garland-Mickey Rooney 1940 film Strike Up the Band.

Background
In 1936, UCLA students were looking for a new rally tune. George and Ira Gershwin had moved from New York to Beverly Hills to work in Los Angeles on the Fred Astaire movie Shall We Dance. Maxson Judell, a music industry contact, approached them about contributing a song to UCLA.  The Gershwins made a gift of the song to the University of California, Los Angeles. Ira Gershwin revised the lyrics and called the new version "Strike Up the Band for UCLA". From that time, it became one of the primary school songs, and even served as the leitmotif and rally song for the school teams until Sons of Westwood and later Mighty Bruins became school songs. The UCLA Band currently plays an arrangement of "Strike Up the Band for UCLA" as part of each UCLA Bruins football pregame show and previously played the song at home basketball games.

The George and Ira Gershwin Award is presented annually at UCLA during Spring Sing at Pauley Pavilion or at the Los Angeles Tennis Center on campus. Recipients have included Frank Sinatra, 
Clive Davis, Stevie Wonder, k.d. lang, James Taylor, Kenneth Babyface Edmonds, Burt Bacharach, Quincy Jones, Lionel Richie, Julie Andrews and Brian Wilson.

Notable recordings
Bing Crosby recorded the song in 1956 for use on his radio show and it was subsequently included in the box set The Bing Crosby CBS Radio Recordings (1954-56) issued by Mosaic Records (catalog MD7-245) in 2009. 
Chris Connor - Warm Cool: The Atlantic Years (2000)
Ella Fitzgerald - Ella Fitzgerald Sings the George and Ira Gershwin Songbook (1959)
The Boston Pops have recorded the song for multiple albums: Fiedler's Favorite Marches and Marches in Hi Fi conducted by Arthur Fiedler, as well as Pops Stoppers conducted by John Williams.
Rosemary Clooney - for her album Rosemary Clooney Sings the Lyrics of Ira Gershwin (1979).
Tony Bennett - included in the album Strike Up the Band (1959)

References

External links 
American Classics - Strike Up the Band

1927 songs
American marches
Songs from musicals
Songs with music by George Gershwin
Songs with lyrics by Ira Gershwin
Pop standards
American college songs
College fight songs in the United States
Pac-12 Conference fight songs